The Guyana Telephone and Telegraph Company is a fixed local exchange carrier (LEC) based in Guyana, South America. It is the largest provider of telecommunication services in Guyana with a subscriber base exceeding three hundred thousand in a country with a population  of about seven hundred thousand. Its parent company is the Atlantic Tele-Network.

History
On June 18, 1990, the Government of Guyana (GOG) and Atlantic Tele-Network (ATN) signed an agreement that would create a new, private limited liability company, GTT. ATN purchased 80 percent of the issued share capital and the GOG retained 20 percent of the company. The GOG later sold these shares to Hong Kong Golden Telecoms Company Limited.

Consistent with this agreement, the previous telecommunications provider, government-owned Guyana Telecommunication Corporation (GTC) was dissolved, and, on January 28, 1991, the new private sector company, GTT, commenced operations under new management as a subsidiary of ATN.

GTT was granted licenses under the Post and Telegraph Act (Cap 47:01 of the Laws of Guyana) for:

 The exclusive provision of public, radio and pay station telephone services and national and international voice and data transmission;
 The exclusive sale of advertising in any directories of telephone subscribers;
 The exclusive provision of switched and non-switched service supported by facilities constructed over public right-of-way; and
 The non-exclusive provision of a) terminal and customer premises equipment, and b) telefax, telex and telegraph services, and cellular radio telephone service.

As a private sector utility provider, GTT's operations and conduct are regulated by the Telecoms Act of 1990, the Public Utilities Commission Act of 1990, and the GOG/ATN Agreement.

Services 

Initially GTT’s focus was on the provision of local fixed line, long-distance and international voice calls. These services are used today, however not as extensively as before. GTT has expanded its residential portfolio services to include DSL, Blaze, fixed LTE, mobile services and roaming, while business customers can experience Biz Fibre, Cloud Solutions, Circuits, PBX. 

The company has an application through which customers can pay their bills, view payment history and top up their mobile accounts. smsbot and chatbot are mediums through which customers can interact with GTT representatives and MMG services.

International voice traffic is carried for GTT by Verizon, EssexTel, Telesur, BDS (Lime), IDT, TATA, TSTT, Telco-214, AT&T while international collect calling is provided through agreements with Verizon, TSTT and AT&T. The Earth Station in Thomas Lands which previously received and relayed international voice and data traffic is now utilized for domestic traffic.

GTT constructed Guyana’s first submarine fibre optic cable which was launched under the brand name “emagine” in the early 2000s.

GTT has positioned itself with the resources and technologies to handle the demands which will arise in Guyana with the emerging oil and gas sector.

GTT publishes the Guyana Telephone Directory.

GTT has developed a smart phone mobile payment system.

Structure 
Many of the main offices are located in Georgetown, Guyana.  The corporate headquarters campus is divided into the Telephone House which houses the commercial headquarters of the company as well as customer service call centers and the operator service center.  The Executive Suite, which has its own entrance, parking and security houses, the office space of key employees and executives.  The Human Resources offices have a separate building.  The Residential Service Unit, houses the residential and government services offices and the collections office.  The Central Telegraph Office houses telegram and telegraph services, accounting and finance departments and the office of the Director of Customer Services.  The Technical Headquarters in the Thomas Lands area also houses the International Earth Station.

The East Coast Office is located in Beterverwagting, Demerara.  In addition to the regional manager, is also houses the domestic satellite station.  Other commercial offices are located in Retrieve, Linden and New Amsterdam, Berbice.

GTT also owns a web-enabled outsourcing call center to Latin America and the Caribbean, Atlantic Tele-Center, Inc.,  located just outside Georgetown, Guyana.

Senior management team 

Founder/Principal Shareowner (Cornelius B Prior)
Board of Directors (Justin Benincasa (Chairman), Barry Fougere, Xun Xi, John Audet) 
Chief Executive Officer (Damian Blackburn)
Chief Technical Officer (Russell Davis)
VP Finance and Corporate Controller (David Soo Ting)

Competitors 
GTT's main competitor is [[Jamaican-based Digicel, headquartered in Kingston, Jamaica.

References

External links
Corporate Website
GT&T Wireless
Guyana Online

Telecommunications companies of Guyana